Poland competed at the 1998 Winter Olympics in Nagano, Japan.

Alpine skiing

Men

Men's combined

Biathlon

Men

Women

Bobsleigh

Cross-country skiing

Men

Women

 2 Starting delay based on 5 km results. 
 C = Classical style, F = Freestyle

Figure skating

Luge

Short track speed skating

Men

Ski jumping

Snowboarding

Slalom

Halfpipe

Speed skating

Men

References
Official Olympic Reports
 Olympic Winter Games 1998, full results by sports-reference.com

Nations at the 1998 Winter Olympics
1998
1998 in Polish sport